Calder may refer to:

People
Calder (surname)
Clan Calder, a Highland Scottish clan

Places
 Calder, Tasmania, Australia, a locality
 Calder, Edmonton, a neighbourhood in the city of Edmonton, Alberta, Canada
 Calder, Saskatchewan, Canada, a village
 Rural Municipality of Calder No. 241, Saskatchewan, Canada, a rural municipality
 Calder, Cumbria, England, a village
 Calder, Saint Vincent and the Grenadines, a town on the island of Saint Vincent
 Cawdor, Scotland, original name Calder, a Highland council area
River Calder (disambiguation), in Scotland, Northern England, and Australia

Sports
 Calder Cannons, an Australian rules football club based in Melbourne, Australia
 Calder Memorial Trophy, awarded to the rookie of the year in the National Hockey League
 Calder Cup, awarded to the winner of the American Hockey League playoffs
 Calder Race Course, a horse racetrack in Miami Gardens, Florida, United States

Other uses
 Calder Abbey in northwest England
 Calder Houses, listed on the National Register of Historic Places in Linn County, Iowa, United States
 Calder baronets, two baronetcies created for people with the surname Calder
 Calder Publishing, a British publishing company specializing in works about the arts
 Calder v British Columbia (AG), case decided by the Supreme Court of Canada relating to aboriginal land titles
 Calder Freeway, Victoria, Australia
 Calder Highway, Victoria, Australia
 Calder Pillay, a major character in the Chasing Vermeer children's novel series by Blue Balliet

See also
 East Calder, Mid Calder and West Calder, three villages in West Lothian, Scotland
 Calder Park (disambiguation)
 Calders (disambiguation)